Jamia Faridia Sahiwal is located in Sahiwal, Punjab, Pakistan. This Madrasa is named after Sufi Bābā Farīduddīn Mas'ūd Ganjshakar.

Qibla Manzoor Ahmed Shah Sahib is the Founder of it
 
There are more than 1900 students (male and female). The male and female sections are separate. Studies include Dars-e-Nizami, Tajveed, Hifzul Quran, Mufti course, Computer courses, Metric, F.A, B.A and M.A.
 
It is situated near Faridia Park.

External links 
 Faridia Islamic University

Universities and colleges in Sahiwal District